Bryan Wakeford (12 February 1929 – 13 November 2006) was a South African cricketer. He played in five first-class matches for Border from 1947/48 to 1949/50.

See also
 List of Border representative cricketers

References

External links
 

1929 births
2006 deaths
South African cricketers
Border cricketers